Austskjera is a group of rocks (skerries) in Antarctica, lying close to the coast about  east of Cape Daly,  east-southeast of Safety Island, and  east-southeast of Landmark Point. They were mapped by Norwegian cartographers from aerial photographs taken by the Lars Christensen Expedition, 1936–37, and named "Austskjera" (the "east skerry").

References
 

Rock formations of Mac. Robertson Land
Skerries